Queen Latifah is an American rapper, jazz/blues singer, and actress. Born Dana Owens, also known as Sadot X, is a recording artist, she has released seven studio albums, six of which were hip hop-influenced albums and two that were all-singing jazz-influenced albums. She has released a total of twenty-three singles as well. She has been given the title the "Queen of Jazz Rap".

Latifah released two albums, All Hail the Queen and Nature of a Sista, before leaving all-female rap group JJ Fad, to only moderate success after breaking through with her 1993 album, Black Reign. Black Reign received a gold certification in the United States, reaching number 60 on the Billboard 200 albums chart, and number 15 on the US R&B chart. The album has sold 491,000 copies in the United States. After a five year hiatus, she released Order in the Court on June 16, 1998. The album was a disappointment, selling only 100,000 copies in the United States. After, Latifah released a greatest hits compilation entitled She's the Queen: A Collection of Hits.

Latifah once again found success in 2004 with her fifth studio album, The Dana Owens Album. The album was a success, charting at number 16 on the Billboard 200 albums chart. In 2007, Latifah released her sixth studio album, Trav'lin' Light through Flavor Unit/Verve Records. In 2009, Latifah released her seventh album, Persona through Flavor Unit/Universal Records.

Albums

Studio albums

Compilation albums

Group albums

Collaborative albums

Singles

As lead artist
{| class="wikitable plainrowheaders" style="text-align:center;" border="1"
|+ List of singles and selected chart positions, showing year released and album name
! scope="col" rowspan="2" style="width:18em;"| Title
! scope="col" rowspan="2"| Year
! scope="col" colspan="7"| Peak chart positions
! scope="col" rowspan="2"| Album
|-
! scope="col" style="width:3em;font-size:90%;"| US
! scope="col" style="width:3em;font-size:90%;"| US Dance
! scope="col" style="width:3em;font-size:90%;"| US R&B
! scope="col" style="width:3em;font-size:90%;"| US Rap
! scope="col" style="width:3em;font-size:90%;"| US AC
! scope="col" style="width:3em;font-size:90%;"| NZ
! scope="col" style="width:3em;font-size:90%;"| UK
|- 
! scope="row"| "Wrath of My Madness"
| 1988
|align="center"| —
|align="center"| —
|align="center"| —
|align="center"| —
|align="center"| —
|align="center"| —
|align="center"| —
|align="center" rowspan="6"|All Hail the Queen
|- 
! scope="row"| "Dance for Me"
|rowspan="3"|1989
|align="center"| —
|align="center"| —
|align="center"| —
|align="center"| 14
|align="center"| —
|align="center"| —
|align="center"| —
|- 
! scope="row"| "Ladies First"(featuring Monie Love)
|align="center"| —
|align="center"| 38
|align="center"| 64
|align="center"| 5
|align="center"| —
|align="center"| —
|align="center"| —
|- 
! scope="row"| "Princess of the Posse"
|align="center"| —
|align="center"| —
|align="center"| —
|align="center"| —
|align="center"| —
|align="center"| —
|align="center"| —
|- 
! scope="row"| "Come Into My House"
|rowspan="2"|1990
|align="center"| —
|align="center"| 7
|align="center"| 81
|align="center"| 21
|align="center"| —
|align="center"| —
|align="center"| —
|- 
! scope="row"| "Mama Gave Birth to the Soul Children"(featuring De La Soul)
|align="center"| —
|align="center"| 28
|align="center"| —
|align="center"| —
|align="center"| —
|align="center"| —
|align="center"| 14
|- 
! scope="row"| "Fly Girl"
|rowspan="2"|1991
|align="center"| —
|align="center"| —
|align="center"| 16
|align="center"| 19
|align="center"| —
|align="center"| 37
|align="center"| 67
|align="center" rowspan="3"|Nature of a Sista'''
|- 
! scope="row"|  "Latifah's Had It Up 2 Here"
|align="center"| —
|align="center"| —
|align="center"| 13
|align="center"| 8
|align="center"| —
|align="center"| —
|align="center"| —
|- 
! scope="row"| "How Do I Love Thee"
| 1992
|align="center"| —
|align="center"| 19
|align="center"| 32
|align="center"| —
|align="center"| —
|align="center"| —
|align="center"| —
|- 
! scope="row"| "U.N.I.T.Y."
|1993
|align="center"| 23
|align="center"| —
|align="center"| 7
|align="center"| 2
|align="center"| —
|align="center"| —
|align="center"| 74
|align="center" rowspan="5"|Black Reign|- 
! scope="row"| "Just Another Day..."
|rowspan="4"|1994
|align="center"| 54
|align="center"| —
|align="center"| 37
|align="center"| 11
|align="center"| —
|align="center"| —
|align="center"| —
|- 
! scope="row"| "Black Hand Side"
|align="center"| —
|align="center" rowspan="2"|—
|align="center" rowspan="2"|29
|align="center"| 20
|align="center"| —
|align="center"| —
|align="center"| —
|- 
! scope="row"| "Weekend Love"
|align="center"| 70
|align="center"| —
|align="center"| —
|align="center" rowspan="2"|38
|align="center"| —
|- 
! scope="row"| "I Can't Understand"
|align="center"| —
|align="center"| —
|align="center"| —
|align="center"| —
|align="center"| —
|align="center"| —
|-
! scope="row"| "Mr. Big Stuff"(with Shades and Free)
|rowspan="2"| 1997
|align="center"| —
|align="center"| —
|align="center"| —
|align="center"| —
|align="center"| —
|align="center"| —
|align="center"| 31
| The Associate Soundtrack|- 
! scope="row"| "It's Alright"(featuring Lil' Mo)
|align="center"| 77
|align="center"| —
|align="center"| 31
|align="center"| —
|align="center"| —
|align="center"| —
|align="center"| 86
| Nothing to Lose Soundtrack and Order in the Court|- 
! scope="row"| "Bananas (Who You Gonna Call?)"(featuring Apache)
|rowspan="2"|1998
|align="center"| —
|align="center"| —
|align="center"| —
|align="center"| 2
|align="center"| —
|align="center"| —
|align="center"| —
|align="center" rowspan="2"|Order in the Court'|- 
! scope="row"| "Paper"(featuring Pras)
|align="center"| 50
|align="center"| —
|align="center"| 23
|align="center"| —
|align="center"| —
|align="center"| —
|align="center"| —
|-
! scope="row"| "Everywhere You Go"(featuring Sara Jane)
|2001
|align="center"| —
|align="center"| —
|align="center"| —
|align="center"| —
|align="center"| —
|align="center"| —
|align="center"| —
| What's the Worst That Could Happen? Soundtrack|-
! scope="row"| "Poetry Man"
|rowspan="2"|2007
|align="center"| —
|align="center"| —
|align="center"| —
|align="center"| —
|align="center"| 23
|align="center"| —
|align="center"| —
| rowspan="2"|Trav'lin' Light|-
! scope="row"| "I'm Gonna Live Till I Die"
|align="center"| —
|align="center"| —
|align="center"| —
|align="center"| —
|align="center"| —
|align="center"| —
|align="center"| —
|-
! scope="row"| "Champion"
|rowspan="2"|2008
|align="center"| —
|align="center"| —
|align="center"| —
|align="center"| —
|align="center"| —
|align="center"| —
|align="center"| —
| AT&T Team USA Soundtrack|- 
! scope="row"| "Ting-A-Ling (Refix)"(with Alborosie and Shabba Ranks)
|align="center"| —
|align="center"| —
|align="center"| —
|align="center"| —
|align="center"| —
|align="center"| —
|align="center"| —
|
|-
! scope="row"| "Cue the Rain"
|rowspan="2"|2009
|align="center"| —
|align="center"| —
|align="center"| —
|align="center"| —
|align="center"| —
|align="center"| —
|align="center"| —
| Persona|- 
! scope="row"| "Walk the Dinosaur"(from Ice Age: Dawn of the Dinosaurs)
|align="center"| —
|align="center"| —
|align="center"| —
|align="center"| —
|align="center"| —
|align="center"| —
|align="center"| —
|
|-
! scope="row"| "The Star-Spangled Banner"
|2015
|align="center"| —
|align="center"| —
|align="center"| —
|align="center"| —
|align="center"| —
|align="center"| —
|align="center"| —
|
|-
| colspan="10" style="font-size:90%"| "—" denotes a recording that did not chart or was not released in that territory.
|}

As featured artist

Other collaborations
 Big Bub – "Need Your Love" with Heavy D
 Brandy – "I Wanna Be Down" (Remix) with MC Lyte and Yo-Yo
 Chaka Khan – "Pop My Clutch"
 Channel Live – "Temptations" with Black Rob
 Coldcut – "Smoke Dis One"
 Erykah Badu – "Love of My Life Worldwide" with Bahamadia and Angie Stone
 Living Colour – "Under Cover of Darkness"
 Luther Vandross – "Hit It Again"
 Meredith Brooks – "Lay Down (Candles in the Rain)"
 Monifah – "Fallin in Love"
 Naughty by Nature – "Red Light"
 Naughty by Nature – "Sleepin on Jersey"
 Naughty by Nature – "Wickedest Man Alive"
 Organized Noize – "Set It Off" with Andrea Martin
 Pat Benatar – "Love Is a Battlefield" (Remix)
 Quincy Jones – "Cool Joe, Mean Joe (Killer Joe)" with Tone Loc and Nancy Wilson
 Rapsody – "Hatshepsut"
 Salt N Pepa – "Friends" with Mad Lion
 Take 6 – "Harmony"
 Teena Marie – "Lady's Choice" with Gail Gotti
 The 45 King – "Flavor Unit Assassination Squad" with Lakim Shabazz, Apache, Double J & Lord Alibaski
 Various – "Freedom (Theme from Panther)" with TLC, Aaliyah, Zhane, SWV, MC Lyte, Mary J. Blige, En Vogue, Salt N Pepa, Billy Lawrence, N'Dea Davenport, and more
 Various – "What's Going On" (The Neptunes This One's for You Mix) with Mobb Deep, LL Cool J, Fabolous, Da Brat, N.O.R.E., Royce Da 5'9", Angie Martinez and Sonja Blade
 Zhane – "Request Line" (Remix)
 Various – "Satisfied" (The Hamilton Mixtape) with Sia and Miguel

In 2009, Latifah, along with the Jubilation Choir, recorded the title track on the album Oh Happy Day, covering the song the Edwin Hawkins Singers made popular in 1969.

In 2011, Latifah was featured on the track "Who Can I Turn To (When Nobody Needs Me)" on Tony Bennett's  Duets II. The song won a Grammy for arrangement.

 Soundtrack album contributions 
 The Associate (1996)
 Living Out Loud (1998)
 Chicago (2002)
 Hairspray (2007)
 Joyful Noise (2012)
 Bessie'' (2015)

Notes

References

Rhythm and blues discographies
Hip hop discographies
Discography
Discographies of American artists
Soul music discographies